Brantville may refer to the following locations:
Brantville, New Brunswick
Brantville, West Virginia